Margita Figuli (2 October 1909 – 27 March 1995; known after her marriage as Margita Šustrová and by the penname Ol'ga Morena) was a Slovak prose writer, translator and author of literature for children and young people.

Biography
Margita Figuli was born in a farmer's family in Vyšný Kubín. After her studies in Banská Bystrica, she moved to Bratislava to work as an English correspondent until 1941. Since then she focused on writing only. She died in Bratislava in 1995.

Works

Writing
Margita Figuli is a significant representative of the Slovak school of naturalism. Her works started to be published in 1930 in Slovenská nedeľa (Slovak Sunday), Elán (Spirit), Slovenské pohľady (Slovak views) and other periodicals. Love, compassion, and current social problems were prevalent in her writing. Her best works were translated into German, Russian, Polish, and other languages.

List of selected works
Prose
 1932 – List od otca (Letter from father)
 1938 – Čierny býk (Black bull)
 1940 – Olovený vták (Lead bird)
 1940 – Tri gaštanové kone (Three Chestnut Horses)
 1942 – Tri noci a tri sny (Three nights and three dreams)
 1946 – Babylon
 1973 – Rebeka (Rebecca)
 1974 – Vietor v nás (Wind within us)

For children and young people
 1963 – Môj prvý list (My first letter)
 1964 – Ariadnina niť (Ariadna's yarn)
 1980 – Balada o Jurovi Jánošíkovi (Ballad about Juro Jánošík)

References

External links

 

1909 births
1995 deaths
People from Dolný Kubín District
20th-century Slovak women writers
20th-century Slovak writers
Slovak children's writers
Slovak women children's writers